Workman is a surname coming from the Old English word we(o)rcmann, meaning workman or laborer generally.

List of people with surname Workman

Ariel Winter (born 1998), American actress (born Ariel Workman)
Bill Workman (1940–2019), American politician from South Carolina and economic development consultant
Brandon Workman (born 1988), American baseball player
Charles Workman, Murder Inc. contract killer, took part in killing of Dutch Schultz
Charles H. Workman (1873–1923), English singer and actor
C. Lindsay Workman, American character actor often credited as Lindsay Workman
C. Noel Workman, American college sports coach
E. J. Workman (1899–1982), American atmospheric physicist
Fanny Bullock Workman (1859–1925), American mountaineer and geographer
Hank Workman (1926-2020), American Major League Baseball player
Hawksley Workman (born 1975), stage name of Canadian rock musician Ryan Corrigan 
Haywoode Workman (born 1966), retired NBA player and current NBA referee
Herbert Brook Workman, a leading Methodist in England
Ian Workman (born 1962), former English footballer
Jerome J. Workman, Jr. (born 1952), American spectroscopist, editor, author
Jim Workman (1917–1970), Australian cricketer
Nancy Workman (1940-2020), American politician from Salt Lake City, Utah
Philip Workman, executed by the State of Tennessee in 2007 
Reggie Workman (born 1937), American jazz musician 
Shanelle Workman (born 1978), American actress 
Thomas Workman (disambiguation), multiple people
W. D. Workman, Jr. (1914–1990), American journalist and politician from South Carolina
William Workman (Canadian politician) (1807–1878), Irish-Canadian businessman and politician
William H. Workman (1839–1918), mayor of Los Angeles 
William Workman (1799–1876), California pioneer of the Workman-Temple family
 Willy Workman (born 1990), American-Israeli basketball player for Hapoel Jerusalem in the Israeli Basketball Premier League

References 

English-language surnames
Occupational surnames
English-language occupational surnames